The Bride is a 2015 drama film directed by Paula Ortiz which stars Inma Cuesta, Álex García and Asier Etxeandia. The screenplay is based on Blood Wedding, the 1933 tragedy by Federico García Lorca. It was screened in the Zabaltegi section of the 2015 San Sebastián International Film Festival. It was also named as one of three films that could be chosen as the Spanish submission for the Best Foreign Language Film at the 89th Academy Awards, but it was not selected.

Plot
Leonardo, The Groom and The Bride have been an inseparable triangle since they were children, but Leonardo and The Bride possess an invisible, ferocious, unbreakable thread. The years go by and she, in anguish, is getting prepared for her wedding with The Groom in the middle of the white desert where she lives with her father. The day before the ceremony, a beggar knocks on her door and offers her a present and a piece of advice: "Don't get married if you don't love him", while she gives her two crystal daggers. The Bride's body shudders.

Cast
 Inma Cuesta as La novia (The Bride)
 Asier Etxeandia as El novio (The Groom)
 Álex García as Leonardo
 Luisa Gavasa as Madre (Mother)
 Carlos Álvarez-Nóvoa as Padre (Father)
 Ana Fernández as Vecina (Neighbour)
 Consuelo Trujillo as Criada (Maid)
 Leticia Dolera as Mujer de Leonardo (Leonardo's wife)
 María Alfonsa Rosso as Mendiga (Beggar)
 Manuela Vellés as Muchacha 1 (Young girl 1)
 Verónica Moral
 Mariana Cordero as Suegra (Mother-in-law)
 Pedro Rebollo as Cura

Awards and nominations

|-
| rowspan = "27" align = "center" | 2016
| rowspan="9" | 3rd Feroz Awards
| colspan="2" | Best Drama Film
| 
| rowspan = "9" | 
|-
| Best Director
| Paula Ortiz
| 
|-
| Best Screenplay
| Paula Ortiz, Javier García Arredondo
| 
|-
| Best Main Actress
| Inma Cuesta
| 
|-
| Best Supporting Actor
| Carlos Álvarez-Nóvoa
| 
|-
| Best Supporting Actress
| Luisa Gavasa
| 
|-
| Best Original Soundtrack
| Shigeru Umebayashi
| 
|-
| colspan=2 | Best Trailer
| 
|-
| colspan=2 | Best Film Poster
| 
|-
| rowspan=12 | 30th Goya Awards
| colspan=2 | Best Film
| 
| rowspan = "12" | 
|-
| Best Director
| Paula Ortiz
| 
|-
| Best Adapted Screenplay
| Paula Ortiz, Javier García Arredondo
| 
|-
| Best Actor
| Asier Etxeandia
| 
|-
| Best Actress
| Inma Cuesta
| 
|-
| Best Supporting Actress
| Luisa Gavasa
| 
|-
| Best New Actor
| Álex García
| 
|-
| Best Cinematography
| Miguel Ángel Amoedo
| 
|-
| Best Art Direction
| Jesús Bosqued Maté and Pilar Quintana
| 
|-
| Best Sound
| Clemens Grulich, César Molina and Ignacio Arenas
| 
|-
| Best Makeup and Hairstyles
| Esther Guillem and Pilar Guillem
| 
|-
| Best Original Score
| Shigeru Umebayashi
| 
|-
| rowspan = "6" | 25th Actors and Actresses Union Awards || Best Film Actress in a Leading Role || Inma Cuesta ||  || rowspan = "6" | 
|-
| Best Film Actor in a Leading Role || Asier Etxeandia ||  
|-
| Best Film Actress in a Secondary Role || Luisa Gavasa || 
|-
| Best Film Actor in a Secondary Role || Carlos Álvarez-Nóvoa || 
|-
| rowspan = "2" | Best Film Actress in a Minor Role || Ana Fernández || 
|-
| María Alfonsa Rosso || 
|}

See also 
 List of Spanish films of 2015

References

External links
 

2015 films
2015 drama films
Films set in Spain
2010s Spanish-language films
Films scored by Shigeru Umebayashi
Spanish drama films
2010s Spanish films